Shahrak-e Kondaz (also Romanized as Shahrak-e Kondāz) is a village in Abarj Rural District, Dorudzan District, Marvdasht County, Fars Province, Iran. At the 2006 census, its population was 104, in 24 families.

References 

Populated places in Marvdasht County